Seh Ran Pain (also Romanized as Seh Rān Pā'īn; also known as Sarān-e Pā’īn, Sarān-e Soflá, and Serān) is a village in Mahru Rural District, Zaz va Mahru District, Aligudarz County, Lorestan Province, Iran. At the 2006 census, its population was 117, in 19 families.

References 

Towns and villages in Aligudarz County